Pliny Earle may refer to:

Pliny Earle I (1762–1832), American inventor
Pliny Earle (physician) or Pliny Earle II (1809–1892), American physician

See also
Pliny Earle Goddard (1869–1928), linguist and ethnologist